Demoiselle Conradi (died 1720), was a German opera singer. She was one of the first professional female opera singers in Germany. She was famous in her time. She was engaged at the Hamburg opera in 1690–1709, and also performed in Brunswick and Berlin.

References

 Deutsche-biographie.de : Allgemeine Deutsche Biographie

18th-century German women opera singers
1720 deaths
Year of birth missing
17th-century women opera singers
Musicians from Hamburg